Hire Township is located in McDonough County, Illinois. As of the 2010 census, its population was 229 and it contained 117 housing units.

Geography

Demographics

History
Hire was formerly known as Rock Creek Township. It was named Hire Township in 1857 after George Hire (1790-1881), who served in the Ohio Militia in the War of 1812, and was an Illinois State Legislator in 1856.

References

External links
City-data.com
Illinois State Archives

Townships in McDonough County, Illinois
Townships in Illinois
1856 establishments in Illinois
Populated places established in 1856